Below is a list of current rosters  of teams from ABA League First Division and Second Division:

First Division rosters

Second Division rosters

See also 
 List of current Basketball League of Serbia team rosters

External links
First Division Official Website
Second Division Official Website